Kairat Utabayev (born 16 July 1980 in Tashkent, Kazakh SSR) is a retired Kazakhstani football defender.

Career

Club
Utabayev retired from professional football at the end of the 2012 season, due to an upcoming operation where he received an artificial kidney.

International
Utabayev has made 10 appearances for the Kazakhstan national football team.

Honors

Team
Pakhtakor Tashkent
 Uzbek League (1): 2002
 Uzbekistan Cup (2): 2001, 2002
 Kairat
 Kazakhstan Premier League (1): 2004
 Kazakhstan Cup (1): 2003
 Shakhter Karagandy
 Kazakhstan Premier League (1): 2011

References

External links

1980 births
Living people
Association football defenders
Kazakhstani footballers
Kazakhstan international footballers
FC Kairat players
Pakhtakor Tashkent FK players
FC Megasport players